North High School is a public high school built in the northern area of Davenport, Iowa. North High School was established in 1985 in the building that was formerly Wood Junior High.

In the fall of 1994, ninth graders were added to the school as part of a district-wide reconfiguration of elementary, intermediate, and high schools.  In January 1997, a new gymnasium was completed along with a "Classroom of the Future" and an Iowa Communications Network room. In 2001, a new cafeteria and auditorium were completed. A new locker and weight room were added in 2008 to accommodate visiting sports teams.

Athletics
Davenport North participates in the Mississippi Athletic Conference, and athletic teams are known as the Wildcats.  School colors are blue and gold.

Davenport North is classified as a 4A school, which contains Iowa's 48 largest schools, according to the Iowa High School Athletic Association and Iowa Girls High School Athletic Union; in sports where there are fewer divisions, the Wildcats are always in the largest class (e.g., Class 3A for wrestling, boys soccer, and Class 2A for golf, tennis and girls soccer). The school is a member of the 10-team Mississippi Athletic Conference, which comprises schools from the Iowa Quad Cities along with Burlington, Clinton, and Muscatine high schools.

Successes
 Volleyball - 1988 Class 2A State Champions, 1997 Class 3A State Champions

Notable alumni
 Dana Davis (born 1978), actress, voice actress, and novelist
 Ricky Davis (born 1979), professional basketball player

See also
List of high schools in Iowa

References

1985 establishments in Iowa
Educational institutions established in 1985
Public high schools in Iowa
Schools in Davenport, Iowa